Germany's Next Topmodel, Cycle 8 is the eighth season of Germany's Next Topmodel, and it airs on the German television network ProSieben. The show began to air on 28 February 2013 under the catch phrase Closer than ever. Due to a decrease in ratings for the show, several changes were done. For the first time the show was produced by RedSeven GmbH, who were also previously producing Austria's Next Topmodel. Fashion photographer Enrique Badulescu joined the panel along with Thomas Hayo, who became the first judge - aside from Klum - since Peyman Amin returned for a third time to the show.

As in the last preceding years, a pre-selection was done, and open castings were not part of the show anymore. The first episode started off with 26 semifinalists of whom however only 25 were introduced to the audience. The show however was off with a disappointing launch as it showed a ratings drop in comparison to the last cycle's premiere. The winner was 16-year-old Lovelyn Enebechi from Hamburg.

Among the prizes were a modeling contract with Günther Klum's OneEins Management, an Opel Adams automobile, a spread and a cover in German Cosmopolitan, and a €250,000 cash prize. The international destinations for this cycle were set in Dubai, Los Angeles, New York City and Honolulu.

Contestant Carolin Sünderhauf proved to be the most successful model from the season, booking fashion spreads for Oyster, Elle South Africa, Superpaper, Marie Claire Australia, Elle Sweden, Cosmopolitan Germany, Grazia Germany, L'Officiel Paris, Glamour UK & Teen Vogue. Lookbooks for Altuzarra, Zara & Espirit. And Runway shows for Sonia Rykiel, Malene Birger, Brock Collection, Self Portrait and Junya Watanabe. And did a spreads and was on the covers of Gloria, Coco Indie & Annabelle Magazine.

Episode summaries

Episode 1: Dream Come True
Original airdate: 28 February 2013

The episode began with Heidi visiting the 26 finalists in their hometowns to tell them they have made it onto Germany's Next Topmodel.
The girls did a photo shoot in Wiesbaden. Shortly afterward, Clara decided to leave the competition.

Quit: Clara Zaveta

The 20 girls who impressed Heidi and Thomas were advanced through to the next round in Dubai. From the five worst-performing girls (Janna, Katharina, Lisa, Lisa-Giulia and Nancy), Katharina was chosen to leave the competition.

 Bottom five: Janna Wiese, Katharina Oltzow, Lisa Quack, Lisa-Giulia Wende & Nancy Limonta
 Eliminated outside of judging panel: Katharina Oltzow
The remaining 24 finalists were flown to Dubai, where they walk in a fashion show for Amato Haute Couture. Anna Maria and Sabrina were deemed the best performers. At elimination, Merle was chosen to move on to the next round, but asked to leave the competition, much to the disappointment of Heidi, Thomas and new judge, photographer Enrique Badulescu. The bottom four girls were Anna, Linda, Lisa and Nancy. Anna was chosen to advance and the other three girls were eliminated.

Quit: Merle Lambert
Bottom four: Anna Seebrecht, Linda Niewerth, Lisa Quack & Nancy Limonta
Eliminated: Linda Niewerth, Lisa Quack & Nancy Limonta
Featured photographer: Andreas Ortner

Episode 2: Shooting Edition
Original airdate: 7 March 2013

The girls were divided into two groups of ten, with one group modelling couture dresses while suspended from cranes and the other group shooting underwater.

The bottom two girls for the high-rise shoot were Carolin and Lisa-Giulia. Carolin was saved and Lisa-Giulia was sent home.
 Bottom two: Carolin Sünderhauf & Lisa-Giulia Wende
 Eliminated outside of judging panel: Lisa-Giulia Wende
Luise was announced as the best performer at the underwater shoot. The judges said that all the girls did well, so they were all saved.
 Best photo: Luise Will
 Eliminated outside of judging panel: None
Sophie comes out to the other girls as lesbian, and Anna Maria talks about her difficult childhood in the Philippines, where she lived in a slum. Sabrina receives the news that her grandmother has died. At elimination, Michelle is eliminated. Carolin lands in the bottom two for the second time, along with Anna, but both are saved. At the end of the episode, Heidi reveals that the journey continues in Los Angeles.

Eliminated: Michelle Maas
Bottom two: Carolin Sünderhauf & Anna Barbara Seebrecht
Eliminated: None
Featured photographers: Rankin, Russ Kientsch & Enrique Badulescu

Episode 3: Beauty Edition
Original airdate: 14 March 2013

The girls arrive in Los Angeles and are greeted by Heidi, who informs them that two girls have left the competition: Höpke, who withdrew for personal reasons, and Bingyang, who did not receive a visa.
 Quit: Höpke Voß & Bingyang Liu
Makeovers are administered to girls before the photo shoots. For the first shoot, they take photos for a sedcard, and for the second, they are taken to a hospital and pose with male model Rick "Zombie Boy" Genest. At elimination, Leandra and Leonie land in the bottom two with Leandra being eliminated.

Bottom two: Leandra Martin & Leonie Marwitz
Eliminated: Leandra Martin
Featured photographers: Enrique Badulescu & Robert Erdmann

Episode 4: Runway Edition
Original airdate: 21 March 2013

The episode begins with Carolin being told that she has been booked by a designer for Hong Kong Fashion Week.

Booked for job: Carolin Sünderhauf

This week's topic is Runway. The girls are taught three different styles of walk with the assistance of three models for each walk - the sexy walk taught by Irina Shayk, Prêt-à-porter by Jessica Stam and Haute Couture by Chanel Iman. At the training for the sexy walk, Lovelyn and Leonie are deemed best while Luise, Sophie and Anna Maria perform best at the Prêt-à-porter training. The photo shoot is a face shot. The girls walk as geishas in a Haute-couture-walk. Sophie is deemed to have the best walk and photo, but quits due personal reasons. She is allowed to keep her photo. Anna, Janna, Christine and Maike land in the bottom four. Anna is ultimately eliminated.

Absent from judging panel/immune: Carolin Sünderhauf
Quit: Sophie Jais
Bottom four: Anna Seebrecht, Christine Grischler, Janna Wiese & Maike van Grieken
Eliminated: Anna Seebrecht
Guest judges: Irina Shayk, Jessica Stam, Chanel Iman

Episode 5: Film Edition
Original airdate: 28 March 2013

The remaining girls did a video shoot with different briefs. They also had a challenge where they had to act a scene in front of a green wall and sitting in a car. The challenge winners were Anna Maria and Leonie. At elimination, Sabrina was criticized for having a bad attitude in front of the make up artist. Veronika is told she has also great potential to become an actor because of her fantastic performance. Christine, Janna, Jessika, Lovelyn and Sabrina landed in the bottom five and Jessika is eliminated.

Challenge winner: Anna Maria Damm & Leonie Marwitz
Bottom five: Christine Grischler, Janna Wiese, Jessika Weidner, Lovelyn Enebechi & Sabrina Elsner
Eliminated: Jessika Weidner
Featured director: Jonas Åkerlund
Guest judge: Thomas Rath

Episode 6: Sports Edition
Original airdate: 4 April 2013

The girls wake up early to do sport with a rugby team. They later dance as cheerleaders at a basketball game. The photo shoot is about boxing. Christine and Janna perform worst while Maike is deemed best. At the casting for an editorial in the German Gala, Sabrina, Marie and Carolin are booked. Janna is eliminated for her bad photo shoot and a fauxpas on the runway. Jacqueline is also heavily criticized and told to perform better next week. The remaining 11 girls go to New York City.

Booked for job: Carolin Sünderhauf, Marie Czuczman & Sabrina Elsner
Eliminated: Janna Wiese
Featured photographers: Enrique Badulescu & Tim Petersen

Episode 7: New York/Casting Edition
Original airdate: 11 April 2013

In New York, the girls do a group photo shoot on a bus. Maike and Lovelyn are deemed best and get to go to the AmfAR gala with Heidi as reward for their performance.

The girls are sent to castings for New York Fashion Week. Marie and Anna Maria both walk in two shows, Lovelyn, Maike, Luise and Carolin are booked for one show. During a meeting at IMG Models, Luise is called a million dollar face. Last year's winner, Luisa, is also seen walking in one of the shows the girls walk in.

At panel, Veronika and Jacqueline are in the bottom two in the wake of their weak performance during the week's photoshoot. Even though Jacqueline's walk is worse than Veronika's, the judges feel that Veronika's potential is exhausted and let Jacqueline advance to the next round.

Best photo: Lovelyn Enebechi & Maike van Grieken 
Booked for job: Anna Maria Damm, Carolin Sünderhauf, Lovelyn Enebechi, Luise Will, Maike van Grieken & Marie Czuczman
Bottom two: Jacqueline Thießen & Veronika Weddeling
Eliminated: Veronika Weddeling
Featured photographer: Matt McCabe

Episode 8: Sexy Edition
Original airdate: 18 April 2013

The girls do a sexy photo shoot in lingerie. Lovelyn is deemed best again. When Heidi goes shopping with Jacqueline because of her bad outfits, the other girls feel treated unfairly. At a casting for German Cosmopolitan Maike, Marie, Leonie, Anna Maria and Carolin reach the second round with Maike, Carolin and Anna Maria being booked. Alessandra Ambrosio teaches the girls how to do a sexy walk as part of this week's theme and also serves as a guest judge. Leonie and Jacqueline are in the bottom two. It's not revealed who gets eliminated, leaving the episode with a cliffhanger.

Best photo: Lovelyn Enebechi
Booked for job: Anna Maria Damm, Carolin Sünderhauf & Maike van Grieken
Bottom three: Carolin Sünderhauf, Jacqueline Thießen & Leonie Marwitz
Eliminated: See below
Featured photographer: Ben Watts
Guest judge: Alessandra Ambrosio

Episode 9: Transformation Edition
Original airdate: 25 April 2013

The episode picks up directly were last week's episode ended with a cliffhanger. It is revealed that Jacqueline is sent home.

The week starts with a casting for German Joy. The girls are told to embody different types of characters while walking around in the pedestrian street. While Luise, Marie and Sabrina reach the second round, Carolin is the only one to struggle. In the end Marie gets booked her fourth job. Luise, Lovelyn, Marie, Maike, Anna Maria and Sabrina get great feedback for their photos, while Carolin, Christine and Leonie are criticized.

At the casting for Opel, Lovelyn books her second job. A controversial remark by Maike regarding what type of looks Opel is looking for leads to her ostracization by the other contestants. Leonie is sent home for her weak performance at both photo shoot and runway. Christine and Carolin are also heavily criticized.

Eliminated: Jacqueline Thießen
Booked for jobs: Lovelyn Enebechi & Marie Czuczman
Eliminated: Leonie Marwitz
Featured director: Tim Löhr
Featured photographers: Bob Landers & Kristian Schuller

Episode 10: Action Edition
Original airdate: 2 May 2013

The girls do an action shoot in water. Luise is deemed best and wins the price to go shopping with Lena Gercke, winner of cycle one while Carolin is the weakest. At the second photo shoot Carolin struggles again while Christine surprises the judges.
At panel, Carolin and Marie are deemed the weakest. Carolin is sent home because the judges feel that the others girls have overperformed her. The remaining girls go to Hawaii.

Challenge winner: Luise Will
Bottom two: Carolin Sünderhauf & Marie Czuczman
Eliminated: Carolin Sünderhauf
Featured photographers: Derek Kettela & Oliver S.
Guest judge: Erin Heatherton

Episode 11: Hawaii Edition
Original airdate: 9 May 2013

The girls arrive at Hawaii, where they go camping with Heidi. The weekly shoot is dedicated to shooting each girl in an individual editorial. Luise and Sabrina have fully nude shoots. At this week's casting Anna Maria is booked for an editorial and cover shoot for a surfer's magazine. At panel, Thomas Hayo criticizes Luise for going blank at the casting and Marie for not taking care of her physique. Anna-Maria is criticized for her photoshoot and is told that, if she had not won the casting, she could have been sent home as well. However, Christine gets eliminated as she is the weakest at the weekly photo shoot as well as for her overall weak performances over the past couple of weeks.

Booked for job: Anna Maria Damm
Eliminated: Christine Gischler
Featured photographer: Enrique Badulescu

Episode 12: Music Edition
Original airdate: 16 May 2013

The premise of this week's episode is to embody music icons. Maike is deemed the weakest while Anna Maria and Sabrina perform the best. At the casting for Maybelline, Luise, Anna Maria and Maike reach the second round. Luise and Anna Maria are told that it was a neck and neck between the two, but Luise ultimately gets picked as her beauty-shots are stronger than Anna Maria's. While Luise shoots the campaign, the other girls go to a casting for a music video of the song "Without you" for English boy band, Blue. Anna Maria is booked for the main role while Sabrina, Maike and Marie are booked for supporting roles. Lovelyn is the only one without a job this week. At panel, Marie and Maike land in the bottom two. Although Marie has a better week, Maike has had a stronger overall performance. Marie places sixth.

Booked for job: Luise Will, Anna-Maria Damm, Marie Czuczman, Maike van Grieken, Sabrina Elsner
Bottom two: Maike van Grieken & Marie Czuczman
Eliminated: Marie Czuczman
Featured photographers: Brian Bowen Smith & Kristian Schuller

Episode 13: Semifinale-Evolution Edition
Original airdate: 23 May 2013

At the casting for Gillette Luise, Lovelyn and Maike reach the second round. Luise wins the casting and Lovelyn is disappointed for only placing second. Anna Maria struggles at this week's photo shoot for Cosmopolitan cover. At panel, the girls have to walk in Prêt-à-porter, Sexy and Haute couture outfits. Luise is the first girl to reach the final. Anna Maria is eliminated before Lovelyn also reaches the final. Maike and Sabrina land in the bottom two for struggling on the runway. Surprisingly, both reach the final.

Booked for job: Luise Will
Eliminated: Anna Maria Damm
Bottom two: Maike van Grieken & Sabrina Elsner	
Eliminated: None
Featured director: Katja Brauer-Baratin
Featured photographer: Warwick Saint

Episode 14: Live finale
Original airdate: 30 May 2013

The final starts with the girls walking as Superwomen. During a live performance by Robin Thicke, the girls walk the runway and pose in Burlesque style. The girls third challenge is to walk as the four elements with High fashion dresses and poses. Maike embodies fire, Sabrina is water and Luise is earth which leaves air to Lovelyn. After the walk Sabrina is eliminated. The remaining girls do a photo shoot on stilts where Maike is deemed best. Afterwards they have to walk in futuristic outfits. Luise is second to be eliminated. Anna Maria is chosen to open the Top-20-walk after online voting between the girls who didn't reach the final. The Top 20-walk is done with a live performance by PSY. The final two have to pose in a surprise photo shoot where they have to dance. Lovelyn impresses once again. In the end, Lovelyn becomes Germany's Next Topmodel.

Final four: Lovelyn Enebechi, Luise Will, Maike van Grieken & Sabrina Elsner
Eliminated: Sabrina Elsner
Final three: Lovelyn Enebechi, Luise Will & Maike van Grieken
Eliminated: Luise Will
Top 20 walk opener: Anna Maria Damm
Final two: Lovelyn Enebechi & Maike van Grieken
Germany's Next Topmodel: Lovelyn Enebechi
Special Guests: Psy, Robin Thicke, Bruno Mars
Featured photographer: Enrique Badulescu

Contestants
(ages stated are at start of contest)

Summaries

Results table

 The contestant won best photo
 The contestant quit the competition
 The contestant was immune from elimination
 The contestant was in danger of elimination
 The contestant was eliminated
 The contestant won the competition

Photo shoot guide
 Episode 1 photo shoot: Haute couture in Wiesbaden
 Episode 2 photo shoots: Posing underwater; harnessed to a Crane in couture gowns; desert beauty shots
 Episode 3 photo shoots: Professional comp cards; taken by Zombie Boy to the underworld
 Episode 4 photo shoot: 'Flower power' beauty shots
 Episode 5 photo shoot: Model mug shots
 Episode 6 photo shoot: Boxing in pairs
 Episode 7 photo shoot:  New York City sight-seeing
 Episode 8 photo shoot:  Rodeo Drive street walkers
 Episode 9 photo shoot: Mystical fairies in the woods
 Episode 10 photo shoot: Rooftop spies 
 Episode 11 photo shoot: Editorials in Hawaii 
 Episode 12 photo shoot: Famous musicians
 Episode 13 photo shoot: Cosmopolitan covers

Controversy
Episode 8 ended with a cliffhanger, but the fate of the bottom two was "accidentally" revealed on the official website of ProSieben two days before the broadcasting of episode 9. Another faux pas happened during Episode 9. The remaining girls competed for an Opel commercial but before the winner of that was revealed, the spot has already been shown on television.

In Episode 13, the 'top 3' for the live finale were going to be selected, but before the episode aired, it was revealed online and in badly edited episode promos that four girls actually made it through, and Anna Maria was eliminated. As a result, the cycle has come under heavy criticism from many viewers due to the mishaps in editing, fan favorites being eliminated, and the season's ardent focus on quarrels amongst its contestants.

During the live finale, topless FEMEN activists led by Zana Ramadani stormed the stage calling the show "Heidi's Horror Picture Show".

In February 2023, the Berliner Zeitung published an article about the show with the headline: "Why isn't Germany’s Next Topmodel actually canceled?"

References

Germany's Next Topmodel
2013 German television seasons
Television shows filmed in the United Arab Emirates
Television shows filmed in Hong Kong
Television shows filmed in Los Angeles
Television shows filmed in New York City
Television shows filmed in Hawaii